Andrei Petrovich Ryabushkin (– ) was a Russian painter. His major works were devoted to life of ordinary Russians of the 17th century.

Biography

Andrey Petrovich Ryabushkin was born in the village Stanichnaya sloboda, Borisoglebskiy uezd, Tambov gubernia in 1861. His father and brother were icon painters, and he started to help them from his early childhood. At 14 years old he became an orphan. A student of Moscow School of Painting, Sculpture and Architecture A. Kh. Preobrazhensky, who spent the summer in the village, happened to see the boy’s drawings and was greatly impressed by them. He started to give him lessons and helped him to enter the Moscow School of Painting, Sculpture and Architecture. Ryabushkin was one of the youngest student of the school at all times.

Ryabushkin stayed for seven years (1875–82) in the Moscow School, learning from Vasily Perov and Illarion Pryanishnikov. His first large work Peasant Wedding was bought by Pavel Tretyakov in 1880. After the death of Vasiliy Perov, Ryabushkin moved to Saint Petersburg in 1882, and entered the Imperial Academy of Arts where he learned from Pavel Chistyakov. The classes soon disappointed him, however, and he began to spend more and more time either in the library of the academy or sketching in the streets.

His studies at the academy came to an end in 1892. He did not receive an award for his diploma work, Descent from the Cross, as was expected, because he did not follow the approved project. But the work was so good that the president of the academy, Grand Duke Vladimir Alexandrovich, provided Ryabushkin with a stipend for travel and studies abroad from his own means. Instead of going to Italy or Paris, Ryabushkin chose to make a tour of ancient Russian towns (Novgorod, Kiev, Moscow, Uglich, Yaroslavl). The inhabitants of them became his first models and his first critics. He studied the old architecture, items of folk crafts, old weapons, fabrics, tapestries, embroidery, icons, etc. He read ancient books, collected folklore.

He took part in Peredvizhniki exhibitions in 1890, 1892 and 1894 but later broke with the movement.

In the 1890s he lived and worked in the estate of his friend V.F. Tymenev in town of Lyuban (Novgorod gubernia, now Leningrad oblast). In 1901 he built a studio in a village of Didvino close to Lubvino and the estate of his friend I. Belyaev.

His paintings were mostly devoted to the 17th century. He also worked on frescoes for Saint Sophia Cathedral in Novgorod and mosaics for the Church of the Savior on Blood in Saint Petersburg. There are 24 of his mosaics on the walls of Church of the Savior on Blood (17 inside and seven outside) (1897–1900). In the later 19th century he became interested in the life of contemporary Russian peasants (such paintings as Tea-Drinking and A Young Man Breaking into the Girls' Dance).
 
The deep study of history made his paintings very reliable, but they did not evoke any sympathy in his contemporaries. Unlike Vasily Surikov, who used the dramatic historical episodes as his subjects, Ryabushkin painted everyday life of the 17th century. His works lack action, they do not depict social conflicts, as the democrats liked. On the other hand, they are not so “beautiful” to reflect the tastes of the rich conservatives. Nobody knew where to place Ryabushkin’s paintings and just did not accept them.

In 1903 Ryabushkin was diagnosed with tuberculosis. He went to Switzerland for treatment but it did not help. He died in his studio in Didvino on 27 April 1904. He is buried in Lyuban, and his tomb is protected as a cultural monument.

More selected works

See also
 List of Russian artists

References

Notes

Sources
 V.N. Alexandrov History of Russian Art, Minsk, 2004,

External links

On-line gallery of Ryabushkin works
Ryabushkin biography in Russian
Ðÿáóøêèí Àíäðåé Ïåòðîâè÷ at www.cathedral.ru
ÐßÁÓØÊÈÍ, ÀÍÄÐÅÉ ÏÅÒÐÎÂÈ× at www.krugosvet.ru
Topography of mosaics in the Church of Savior on Spilled Blood

1861 births
1904 deaths
20th-century deaths from tuberculosis
19th-century painters from the Russian Empire
Russian male painters
20th-century Russian painters
Peredvizhniki
Tuberculosis deaths in Russia
19th-century male artists from the Russian Empire
20th-century Russian male artists
Moscow School of Painting, Sculpture and Architecture alumni